The Scottish National Party–Scottish Greens agreement, also referred to as the Bute House Agreement, is a power-sharing agreement between the Scottish National Party (SNP) and the Scottish Greens which was agreed in August 2021 to support the Third Sturgeon government.

On 31 August 2021, the SNP and Scottish Greens entered a power-sharing arrangement which resulted in the appointment of two Green MSPs as junior ministers in the government, delivery of a shared policy platform, and Green support for the government on votes of confidence and supply. There was no agreement on oil and gas exploration, but the government now argued that it had a stronger case for a national independence referendum.

History

Background 
Following the 2007 Scottish Parliament election, the SNP won the largest amount of seats but fell short of an overall majority. As a result of this, then SNP leader Alex Salmond sought to form a coalition with the Scottish Liberal Democrats. When those talks failed, the SNP chose to form a one-party minority government. The Scottish Greens signed an agreement where the Greens supported SNP ministerial appointments, but did not offer support for any confidence or budget votes ("confidence and supply"). The draft agreement was unanimously endorsed by the SNP's national executive committee.

Agreement 
On 20 August 2021, following two months of negotiations, the SNP and the Greens announced a new power-sharing agreement. The Scottish Greens required both the majority of its members and a two-thirds majority of its party council to approve of the agreement in a vote before it could be enacted, both of which were achieved. First Minister Nicola Sturgeon announced the power-sharing agreement at Bute House with the Scottish Greens co-leaders Patrick Harvie and Lorna Slater. The agreement is based on the co-operation agreement between the Labour Party and the Green Party in New Zealand, reached in November 2020.

Ministerial posts 
While not an official coalition, it would be the first time in British history that Green politicians would be in government. As part of the agreement, two Scottish Green MSPs were appointed to ministerial posts.

Scottish independence 

The agreement contains a commitment to hold a second referendum on Scottish independence before 2026, and if possible by the end of 2023. The Alba Party criticised the agreement for a lack of urgency.

Other issues 
The agreement will see both parties pledge for an increase investment in active travel and public transport, enhancing tenants' rights, a ten-year £500m Just Transition and establishing a National Care Service.

Housing-related measures in the agreement include the creation of a new housing regulator, greater restrictions on winter evictions and a commitment to implementing a system of rent controls by the end of 2025. Harvie credited tenants' union Living Rent with having "created the political space" for the rent control proposals.

References

External links 
 Shared policy programme

2021 in Scotland
Scottish National Party
Scottish Green Party
Scottish independence
2021 in British politics
August 2021 events in the United Kingdom
Nicola Sturgeon